In sociology, racialization or ethnicization is a political process of ascribing ethnic or racial identities to a relationship, social practice, or group that did not identify itself as such for the purpose of domination and social exclusion. Racialization or ethnicization often arises out of the interaction of a group with a group that it dominates or wants to dominate, and the group that wants to dominate ascribes a racial identity to the other group for the purpose of reproducing or continuing their ways of domination, and for reinforcing their social exclusion practices. It is a process that is evolved through racism, distinguishing dominant group's identity as comparatively different from the non-dominant group for the purpose of oppression. Over time, the racialized and ethnicized group develop the society enforced construct (internalized oppression) that races are real, different and unequal in ways that matter to economic, political and social life, an unhealthy norm that strips them from their dignity of a full humanity. This systemic tool used for oppression and to induce trauma have been commonly used in varying flexibility throughout the history of imperialism, nationalism, racial and ethnic hierarchies.

History 

Racial categories have historically been used as a way to enable an oppressive figure or group to discriminate against other groups or individuals which were seen as different from that of the oppressor. In nineteenth and early twentieth century Europe, artwork was a common form of racialization which targeted countries in the Middle East and Asia. The artwork, predominantly paintings, were portrayed in order to instill prejudice in the Western populations through sexualizing and manipulating images. One of the most prominent examples of Orientalist work in art is a piece by Eugène Delacroix titled Women of Algiers in their Apartment. Dating back to 1834, it portrays three women resting in a harem in exotic clothing while an African woman is dressed in plain clothing, depicting her role as a servant. Fine textiles, hookahs, and other paraphernalia adorn the room, which represents a European fantasy of an exotic scene. Attempts to portray these cultures as strange, foreign and exotic through Orientalism led to intolerance towards the Arab and Asian communities in Europe and the United States. Others argue that Delacroix, who travelled in North Africa sketching extensively, was depicting a realistic scene of the era based on his first-hand knowledge and experience. In such an interpretation the clothing, for example, is consistent with the times, as Arab North Africans dressed differently from Europeans, and kept black slaves who would not have been treated as equals.

Many North African and Middle Eastern countries, such as Tunisia, Algeria, and Syria, were colonized by European nations. These countries were not fully independent until the mid-twentieth century, a time in which globalization began to rise both economically and politically. With the rise of globalization came an expanding cultural influence and an increase in immigration to Western nations. New cultures, ethnic groups, and ideals have contributed to the process of racialization which is familiar in modern society. Racialization is a long process, and members of each group are categorized based on their perceived differences relative to those who are considered elite within a society. Another major contributor to the process of racialization is the media. News outlets, films, television shows, and other forms of public communication portray racial groups to often reflect stereotypes which contribute to the public’s opinion of certain cultural groups. These opinions and stereotypes may become institutionalized and racial groups must then encounter the institutionalized racism that is a result. Dominant groups in a society tend to racialize others because new cultural and racial groups are seen as threatening to their society. These threats instill fear into the dominant members of the society due to the possibility of downward mobility or perceived loss of national security. While threats can be imagined or real, they are most prominent when there is some other issue in the nation, such as a poorly performing economy. The effects of racialization are often more harmful to racial and ethnic groups than the actual racialization itself, a few examples being systemic and structural racism. Further significant research in this area is aiding politicians and policy makers in creating a more equal society that embraces and supports different racial and ethnic groups.

Racialized incorporation 
The process of racialization can affect newly arriving immigrants as well as their second-generation children in the United States. The concept of racialized incorporation bridges the idea of assimilation with critical race studies in general and the concept of racialization in particular. While immigrants may possess specific ethnic and cultural identities associated with their countries of origin, once they arrive in the U.S., they are incorporated into a society that is largely organized along the lines of race. The racial hierarchy in the United States is pervasive in many aspects of life including housing, education, and employment. The racialized incorporation perspective argues that regardless of the ethnic and cultural differences across immigrant groups, racial identification is the ultimate and primary principle of social organization in the United States. So an immigrant from Sweden and his/her U.S. born second-generation children are likely to be incorporated into the White mainstream, while an immigrant from Ghana and his/her U.S. born second-generation children are likely to be incorporated into the Black community. Because the lived experiences of Whites and Blacks in U.S. society diverge in most areas of social life, the racialized category that immigrants and their children are incorporated into will largely determine their experiences and opportunities in the United States. The concept of racialized incorporation is relatively new and was recently applied in a study of self-employment in the United States.

Racialization of religion
An ongoing scholarly debate covers the racialization of religious communities. Adherents of Judaism, Islam, and Sikhism can be racialized when they are portrayed as possessing certain physical characteristics, despite the fact that many individual adherents of those religions do not possess any of those physical characteristics. This racialization extends to the descendants of the adherents, even though those descendants may often convert away from the active observance of the religion of their forebearers but they may also retain the lingering cultural aspects of that religion for familial and communal purposes.

The most immediate effect of the racialization of religion is said to be the internalization of the racialization by the descendants of a religion's adherents, whereby the descendants of a religion's adherents accept and internalize their religiously-influenced familial culture as an ethnoracial distinction and identity. A positive application of racialization is nationalism, whereby the created race seeks to assert cultural and national aspirations which are compatible and accommodating to other groups. A negative application of racialization is racism and discrimination, whereby those who are racialized are barred from participating in any public or private functions of society due to the negative "attributes" of the race which has been assigned to them.

Racialization of labor
The racialization of labor is said to involve the segregation and appointment of workers based on perceived ethnic differences. This racialization of labor is said to produce a hierarchical arrangement which limits employee agency and mobility based on their race. The process of racialization is reinforced through presupposed, stereotypical qualities which are imposed upon the racialized person by the racializer. Racialization is then normalized by the promotion of "colorblindness" through the use of "soft" language which avoids highlighting ethnic differences.

The racialization of labor specially limits upward mobility of a person based on race. Dominant racialized labor groups, mainly White/European workers, are generally presented more privileges than subordinate labor groups, mainly Black or Hispanic workers. The subordinate labor groups face the denial of basic citizenship rights, more exploitation, and inferior working conditions. Furthermore, they are less likely to move up in rank within a company or advance to a higher job position.

Members of the dominant race (e.g., whites) benefit from the privileges of whiteness, whether these are material or psychological, and are maintained and reproduced within social systems As a result, immigrant workers, especially Latino and Black workers, experience poor working conditions in day labor work. Day laborers experience "race" and this has impacted their integration into the labor market.

Furthermore, research by Edna Bonacich, Sabrina Alimahomed Jake B. Wilson, 2008 regarding the effects of race and criminal background on employment indicates that Black men need to work more than twice as hard as white men to secure the same job. Being Black in America today is about the same as having a felony conviction in terms of one’s chances of finding a job. Specifically, “the combination of minority status and criminal background appears to intensify employers’ negative reactions, leaving few employment prospects for black ex-offenders (200 applications resulted in only 10 callbacks)”. Additionally, According to Chetty, Hendren, Kline, and Saez, the effect of race segregation impacts the labor market, saying “upward income mobility is significantly lower in areas with larger African American Populations”. Race segregation may lead to divergent economic outcomes due to the fact that areas with larger black population tend to be more segregated by income and race and have adverse effects.

Lastly, the decline of labor unions has negatively affected racialization of labor. Those who would have benefited from union membership no longer will as labor unions continue to diminish. In Jake Rosenfeld’s article, Little Labor: How Union Decline Is Changing the American Landscape, he describes people who can no longer benefit from labor unions: “an immigrant employee who once would have been organized, a female African-American worker no longer able to rely on a union wage to reduce pay gaps with her white counterpart, or a less-educated worker lacking the training, resources, and knowledge to participate in politics”.

Racialization in education 
Racialization in an educational setting is apparent based on the teacher and the background they come from. The teacher’s race along with their views that came along through socialization growing up can affect the way the students portray themselves in a classroom setting. It also has to do with the number of people who come from the same background because the majority of a population will dictate which group is being racialized. An example of students being racialized by their teachers and institutions can be seen through the way high schools teach in America today. Schools tend to teach classes that focus on a more Anglo-Saxon point of view without incorporating any diverse classes that would accommodate for the population of students that come from diverse backgrounds like Latinos, African, and Native Americans.

For example, Desert View High School in Arizona has a great population of Native American students who wish to learn more about their cultural background and where they came from. However, author Timothy J. San Pedro who wrote “Truth, in the End, Is Different From What We Have Been Taught: Re-Centering Indigenous Knowledges in Public Schooling Spaces” found that the school mainly focuses on the “Americanized” perspective of history that does not tell the whole story on what came to be in the Native American population. For example, San Pedro describes how the Desert View High School has posters of history classes that glorify “explorers” that were really conquerors of people who initially settled in areas that were “discovered” (San Pedro 2016). That idea of limiting the Native American population from learning about themselves forces them to assimilate to the culture where they are being racialized in an educational setting. They are forced to conform and be put under a racial category among their American teachers and learn things that do not pertain to their culture or social identity.

Racialization and gender 
Through the process of racialization, social groups are distinguished and subjected to different treatment on the basis of supposedly biological, phenotypic, cultural, and gender characteristics. Racialization can affect anyone in any race. Therefore, racialization and gender can often intersect (Elabor-Idemudia. 1999). Just as racism and gender intersect or discrimination and gender intersect it is easy for racialization to overlap with gender. During racialization, certain racial categories are created and distinctive and stereotypical characteristics are attributed to that specific category. Within these categories, there can also be subcategories of racialization such as Euro American men or African American women. Often immigrants who migrate to the U.S. are affected by racialization if they are not white and fit more into a minority group. For example, African American women may often be stereotyped as uneducated, loud, or improper. Through racialization, if a woman of African descent immigrated to the U.S people will attribute those same stereotypes to her because through a racial lens, she fits the African American woman category. Therefore, those same stereotypes will be applied to her as well. Racialization combined with gender can also be seen through the actions of the person that is racializing the other.

Racialization and incarceration
Coming to fruition in the 1980s, the United States began to enact extensive legal reforms that worked to create a more punitive society. These reforms include mandatory minimum sentences, trying juveniles as adults, three strikes and you’re out laws, truth in sentencing practices, and many other policies and practices which served to increase reliance on imprisonment in response to crime. As a result, U.S. society has been pegged with a “mass incarceration” structure. A recent report has concluded that nearly 1 in 100 U.S. adults are incarcerated and nearly 7.3 million Americans are either in prison or under parole. Although these reforms were intended to apply to all citizens regardless of race, this has not proven to be the reality. Statistically, these punitive reforms have disproportionately impacted African Americans. Specifically, those who are uneducated and/or live in low-income areas. Some have renamed the emergence of the “mass incarceration” society as rather the emergence of “racialized mass incarceration.” The numbers are much more alarming for African Americans behind bars; nearly 1 in 15 African Americans are incarcerated and more narrowly 1 in 9 African American men are incarcerated. These numbers point to an obvious discrimination towards blacks in the U.S. criminal justice system. 
	
One clear reason for these disproportionate imprisonment rate can be tied to poverty and social structures. In particular, a pronounced weak attachment to labor among many working-age adults in black communities has fostered a common experience of poverty and economic hardship. Ultimately this has served to create social spaces where bonds of family and community begin to fray and fall apart. These types of environments have created higher levels of juvenile crime, drug use, and even violent and gang-oriented crimes. Although white Americans too have a history of living in poverty, the average national rate of family disruption and poverty among blacks is two to four times higher than among whites. Furthermore, another reason for the United States racialized prison system can be seen with the war on drugs. Despite similar rates of drug use among blacks and whites, blacks make up 50% of those incarcerated for drug use compared to only 26% of whites. 
	
While the two examples above point to definite explanations for the United States racialized prison system, ultimately the most salient explanation for disproportionate imprisonment rates is public opinion and prejudice. Social stereotypes and stigmas have created assumptions about African Americans that make them more susceptible to arrest and imprisonment. These latter factors are often influenced by society’s outlook on the prison system. Most educated middle- or upper-class individuals are for things such as the death penalty, minimum sentences, and trying juveniles as adults, which combined with social stigmas make blacks unfairly disadvantaged in the realm of criminal justice. For example, in recent times, these effects can be seen in an increase in police brutality towards minorities. Statistically, it is 2.5 times more likely for blacks to be killed than whites.

See also
Critical race theory
Postcolonialism
Racialized society
Scientific racism

Notes

References

Race and society